Danny Jay (born 1993) is a British film composer and music producer. In December 2008, Danny received the Michael Kamen Award for outstanding achievement in the field of composing music. The award was presented by Nitin Sawhney, Justin Baron (Sibelius), and Mrs Kamen at the Mermaid Theatre in London.



Career

Television credits 
2008 -Billy - Casualty
2009 -Extra - Skins

Film credits 
2010 Sonny - Sonny

Awards 
2001 - Bath Chronicle Entertainment Awards for Best Performance in a musical (Billy Elliot - Billy Elliot)
2003 - Rose Bowl Awards for Outstanding Young One (Tom Thumb - Barnum)
2007- Bristol Hippodromes One to watch in the future
2008 - Rose Bowl Award for outstanding performance (Tobias - Sweeney Todd)
2010 - Bath Chronicle Outstanding Contribution to entertainment for his service to amateur dramatics
2011 Queens Theatre Award for Best Newcomer (Jonathan - Raged In)

References

1993 births
Living people
English male stage actors
English people of Croatian descent